Top Chef is an American reality competition television series which premiered on Bravo on March 8, 2006. The show features chefs competing against each other in culinary challenges. The contestants are judged by a panel of professional chefs and other notables from the food and wine industry, with one or more contestants eliminated in each episode. The show is produced by Magical Elves Productions, the company that created Project Runway. 

The success of the show has resulted in multiple spin-offs, such as Top Chef Masters, Top Chef: Just Desserts, Top Chef Junior, Top Chef Amateurs, and Top Chef Family Style, as well as Spanish-language spin-offs, including Top Chef Estrellas and Top Chef VIP. Numerous international adaptations of the show have also been produced.

The twentieth season, Top Chef: World All-Stars, premiered on March 9, 2023.

Show format

Basic format

Top Chef is a cooking show that uses a progressive elimination format. The beginning of each season starts with twelve to nineteen professional chefs selected through auditions. The chefs are brought to the season's host city or state, which typically inspires themes throughout the season. The chefs live in a provided apartment or house during the season, with limited access to outside communication. The chefs participate in each episode in a Quickfire Challenge and an Elimination Challenge (described below). The winner of the Quickfire Challenge is typically granted immunity from elimination, a prize, or another benefit for the following Elimination Challenge. As the name suggests, the loser of the Elimination Challenge is eliminated from the competition. This format continues until two or three chefs remain. Each finalist is challenged to create a full-course meal; the chef with the best meal, as determined by the judges, is declared the "Top Chef" of the season. Towards the end of the season, when only four or five chefs remain, the show moves to another location to finish out the competition.

In the Quickfire Challenge, chefs must cook a dish that meets certain requirements (for example, using specific ingredients or inspiring a particular taste) or participate in a culinary-related challenge (for example, a mise en place relay race or a taste testing contest). They are usually given an hour or less to complete these tasks. The Quickfire Challenge traditionally begins with the host saying, "Your time starts now," and ends with the host saying, "Hands up, utensils down." A guest judge selects one or more chefs as the best in the challenge. Early in the season, the winning chef(s) are granted immunity from the episode's Elimination Challenge. As the number of contestants dwindles, immunity is withdrawn, and instead, the winner receives an advantage (such as being the team leader for a team challenge or getting the first pick of ingredients) or a prize (such as chef's knives, wine, or cash). High-stakes Quickfire Challenges continued onward in further seasons. Season 12 of Top Chef introduced the "Sudden Death Quickfire Challenge," where the chef with the least successful dish faces immediate elimination unless they win a cook-off against another competitor.

In the Elimination Challenge, the chefs prepare one or more dishes to meet the challenge requirements, which often includes a specific theme and are usually more complex and require more time to execute than a Quickfire Challenge. Elimination Challenges may be individual challenges or require chefs to work in teams; some may require the contestants to produce several courses. Teams may be selected by the remaining chefs but are more often determined by a random process, such as "drawing knives" from a knife block. The time limit for an Elimination Challenge may range from a few hours to a few days, typically including preparation and planning time. Ingredients for Elimination Challenges generally allow chefs access to the Top Chef pantry and the ingredients they previously purchased at a grocery store within a specified budget and shopping time limit. However, certain challenges may provide specific ingredients or limit the type or number of ingredients used, while others require non-traditional methods for obtaining ingredients (such as asking people door-to-door or fishing). After shopping, the contestants will cook for up to four judges, usually including at least one guest judge. In most cases, the contestants also cook for a group of guest diners.

After the Elimination Challenge, the chefs report to the Judges' Table, where the judges will deliberate on their choices for the best and worst dishes. The judges may also consider guests' comments, if available. The top individuals or teams are called in and may be asked questions about their dishes or preparation before they are notified of their placement. One or more chefs are named the winner of the challenge and may be awarded an additional prize by the guest judge. The same procedure is repeated with the poorest performing chefs or teams, after which a similar discussion occurs. From this group, one or more chefs are chosen for elimination, with the host asking the chef(s) to leave by saying, "Please pack your knives and go." This is usually followed by a knife-packing sequence for the eliminated chef(s), with a voice-over of their final thoughts about their performance, at the close of the episode. According to the credits, some elimination decisions are made in consultation with the show's producers.

The prize money awarded to the Top Chef was $100,000 for Seasons 1-5, which was increased to $125,000 for Seasons 6-7 and 9-16. It was temporarily increased to $200,000 for Season 8. The prize was then increased again to $250,000, beginning with Season 17. Furthermore, a fan vote is held each season to determine the Fan Favorite, which features an additional $10,000 prize.

Special formats

Midway through each season, the contestants participate in a "Restaurant Wars" (or similarly named) Elimination Challenge. They are split into two teams, created by the previous Quickfire Challenge winner or by drawing knives. In these teams, the chefs must transform an empty space into a functioning pop-up restaurant within a set time limit and budget, selecting and creating the name, theme, décor, and menu. Typically, one team member is designated the role of executive chef, who is responsible for managing the kitchen and expediting food, while another team member is designated as front of house, who is responsible for training the waitstaff and managing the dining room. Season 4 featured not only Restaurant Wars but a "Wedding Wars" challenge as well. Season 16 introduced the challenge much earlier in the season, during its fourth episode, and utilized three teams instead of the usual two.

In the final Elimination Challenge, the two or three remaining chefs must prepare a multiple-course dinner with the assistance of sous chefs. These sous chefs could be previously eliminated contestants, members of the contestants' families, or celebrity chefs. The winner is selected based on the overall quality of their meal. There is typically no Quickfire Challenge during this episode.

Last Chance Kitchen

The Last Chance Kitchen is a web series, first introduced in Season 9, featuring challenges in which the contestants compete for a chance to re-enter the main competition. Each week, two or more previously eliminated chefs compete against each other in the Top Chef kitchen, with the results judged solely by Tom Colicchio. Each week's winner(s) moves on to face the next eliminated Top Chef contestant(s), while the loser is eliminated from the competition for good. Initially, only the winner of the final episode of Last Chance Kitchen returned to compete. However, beginning with Season 15, the format was changed to allow two chances to re-enter. The series won a Primetime Emmy Award for Outstanding Creative Achievement in Interactive Media — Multiplatform Storytelling in 2013, and has been nominated five times for the Primetime Emmy Award for Outstanding Short Form Nonfiction or Reality Series.

Seasons

Spin-offs

Top Chef Masters

Top Chef Masters features established, award-winning chefs, in contrast to Top Chef, which typically features younger, up-and-coming chefs. The series debuted on June 10, 2009, with contestants including Rick Bayless, John Besh, Michael Chiarello, Wylie Dufresne, Jonathan Waxman and Hubert Keller. As of 2013, five seasons have been produced and aired. During its first two seasons, food journalist Kelly Choi hosted the show, while restaurant critic Gael Greene, culinary expert and Saveur  editor-in-chief James Oseland, and food critic Jay Rayner served as judges. Beginning with the third season, celebrity chef Curtis Stone replaced Choi as host.

Top Chef: Just Desserts

Top Chef: Just Desserts is a spin-off of the Top Chef format featuring pastry chefs. Bravo announced the series on October 25, 2009. The show was hosted by Top Chef regular Gail Simmons. The judging panel included pastry chef Johnny Iuzzini, Top Chef Masters finalist Hubert Keller, and DailyCandy's "editor-at-large" Dannielle Kyrillos. The show debuted on Bravo on September 15, 2010, following the seventh season finale of Top Chef. The series was cancelled after two seasons.

Top Chef Healthy Showdown

Top Chef Healthy Showdown is a special webisode series aired in 2011 sponsored by Healthy Choice. It featured former Top Chef contestants Sara Nguyen (Season 3), Ryan Scott (Season 4), Casey Thompson (Season 3, Season 8), and Tre Wilcox (Season 3, Season 8) competing in a series of Quickfire Challenges to win $25,000 and inspire a Top Chef line of Healthy Choice entrées. The series was hosted by Curtis Stone; Ryan was declared the winner of the competition.

Life After Top Chef

Life After Top Chef is a spin-off featuring former Top Chef contestants Richard Blais, Jennifer Carroll, Spike Mendelsohn, and Fabio Viviani, which focuses on various aspects of their lives, from managing and opening a restaurant to dealing with family dynamics and personal issues. The series premiered on October 3, 2012.

Top Chef Estrellas

Top Chef Estrellas is a Spanish-language spin-off featuring eight Hispanic celebrities competing to win $100,000 for their charity of choice. It was hosted by actress Aylín Mújica and judged by chefs Lorena Garcia, Jaime Martín Del Campo, and Ramiro Arvizu. As part of the adaptation, eliminated celebrities were not sent home, but rather became sous-chefs for the remaining contestants. The series premiered on Telemundo on February 16, 2014.

Top Chef Duels

Top Chef Duels brings back contestants from past seasons of Top Chef and Top Chef Masters, pitting them against each other in head-to-head challenges. The winner of each match-up advanced to the season finale, where one chef received $100,000. The series premiered on August 6, 2014.

Top Chef Junior

Top Chef Junior is a spin-off series originally ordered in 2008 for an eight-episode run on Bravo. The show had never aired, nor is it known if any episodes were produced at that time. However, nine years later, Top Chef Junior was mentioned as part of the initial lineup for Universal Kids, an NBCUniversal-owned children's channel launched on September 9, 2017. The series features young chefs between the ages of 9–14. It was hosted by actress Vanessa Lachey, with Top Chef Masters and Top Chef Duels host Curtis Stone serving as its head judge. The first season of Top Chef Junior premiered on October 13, 2017, and its second season premiered on September 8, 2018.

Top Chef Amateurs

Top Chef Amateurs is a spin-off featuring home cooks competing in head-to-head challenges drawn from past seasons of Top Chef. Production of the show began in October 2020 in Portland, Oregon, following the filming of the original series eighteenth season. The series was hosted by Gail Simmons and premiered on July 1, 2021.

Top Chef Family Style 

Top Chef Family Style is a spin-off featuring young chefs teaming up with adult family members to compete for $100,000. The series was ordered in May 2021 by streaming service Peacock. It is hosted by singer-songwriter Meghan Trainor with Top Chef Masters winner Marcus Samuelsson serving as head judge. The series premiered on September 9, 2021, and episodes from the series made their linear premiere on Bravo in 2022.

Top Chef VIP 

Similar to Top Chef Estrellas, Top Chef VIP is a Spanish-language spin-off featuring sixteen Hispanic celebrities competing for $100,000. It is hosted by actress Carmen Villalobos and judged by chefs Antonio de Livier, Adria Marina Montaño and Juan Manuel Barrientos. The series premiered on Telemundo on August 9, 2022.

International adaptations

Other media

Top Chef University

Top Chef University is a comprehensive online culinary school involving 12 courses and over 200 in-depth video lessons. The program takes participants through a structured program of the basics (knife skills, kitchen set-up, ingredients) to advanced culinary techniques (sous-vide, molecular gastronomy). The instructors at Top Chef University consist of the series' most successful and popular former contestants. Enrollment costs $25 for a monthly membership and $200 for an annual membership.

Top Chef: The Game

Top Chef: The Game is a computer game released by Brighter Minds for PCs. It challenges players to create the best dish from items in a virtual pantry. Games magazine gave the game an unfavorable review, calling it a "quick cash-in... for an undiscriminating audience."

TV dinners

To make certain dishes available to viewers who watch Top Chef but do not have time to prepare them, Schwan's Home Service started offering Top Chef—branded frozen meals in late 2009.

Cookbooks

On March 20, 2008, Chronicle Books released Top Chef: The Cookbook, with a foreword by Tom Colicchio. On September 30, 2009, Chronicle Books released Top Chef: The Quickfire Cookbook, with a foreword by Padma Lakshmi. On July 14, 2010, Chronicle Books released How to Cook Like a Top Chef, with a foreword by Rick Bayless.

Reception and awards

Awards

Top Chef was nominated at the 59th Primetime Emmy Awards in 2007 for Outstanding Cinematography for Reality Programming and Outstanding Reality-Competition Program for its second season. Top Chef won the award for Outstanding Picture Editing For Reality Programming at the 60th Primetime Emmy Awards in 2008. Top Chef won the award for Outstanding Reality-Competition Program at the 62nd Primetime Emmy Awards, defeating The Amazing Race, which had won the award every year since the category's inception in 2003.

Time magazine's James Poniewozik named Top Chef one of the Top 10 Returning Series of 2007, ranking it at #10.

Ratings

See also

 List of Top Chef contestants

References

Notes

Bibliography

External links

 
 Production website
 

Top Chef
2006 American television series debuts
2000s American cooking television series
2010s American cooking television series
Bravo (American TV network) original programming
Primetime Emmy Award for Outstanding Reality Program winners
Primetime Emmy Award-winning television series
English-language television shows
Reality competition television series
Television series by Magical Elves
Cooking competitions in the United States